"Free Weekend" was an American television play broadcast on December 4, 1958, as part of the CBS television series, Playhouse 90.

Plot
During "parents' weekend" at Camp Mojave, parents maneuver to aid their children in winning the camp's awards.

Cast
The cast included the following:

 Charles Bickford as Marvin
 Jim Backus as Jerry
 Buddy Ebsen as Phil
 Ned Glass as Lester Green
 Henny Backus as Mrs. Green
 James Whitmore as Guy Cato
 Kim Hunter as Shirley Cato
 Nina Foch as Wanda Newton
 Jack Albertson as Herbert Sands
 Nancy Marchand as Sylvia Sands
 Paul Langton as Paul Newton
 Lee Kinsolving as Richard Cato
 June Dayton as Dorothy Gordon
 Michael Landon as Victor Gordon
 Dee Pollock as Larry Newton
 Peter Votrian as Neil Sands

Production
The program aired on December 4, 1958, on the CBS television series Playhouse 90. It was written by Steven Gethers. John Houseman was the producer and Fielder Cook the director.

References

1958 American television episodes
Playhouse 90 (season 3) episodes
1958 television plays